The volleyball tournaments at the 2016 European Universities Games were played between 18 and 24 July. 31 teams from 26 universities of 17 European countries participated in the tournament. The tournament took place in Zagreb, Croatia.

Men's tournament

Pool composition
University of Warsaw from Poland withdrew from the tournament.

Preliminary round
All times are Central European Daylight Time–(UTC+02:00)

Pool A

|}

|}

Pool B

|}

|}

Pool C

|}

|}

Pool D

|}

|}

Playoff round

13th–15th classification
Round-robin classification

|}

|}

9th–12th bracket

Classification (9th–12th)

11th place

9th place

Championship bracket

Quarterfinals

Classification (5th–8th)

Semifinals

7th place

5th place

3rd place

Final

|}

Final standing

Women's tournament

Pools composition

Preliminary round
All times are Central European Daylight Time–(UTC+02:00)

Pool A

|}

|}

Pool B

|}

|}

Pool C

|}

|}

Pool D

|}

|}

Playoff round

9th–16th bracket

Classification

13th–16th Playoffs

9th–12th Playoffs

Championship bracket

Quarterfinals

5th–8th Playoffs

Semifinals

Final classification

15th place

|}

13th place

|}

11th place

|}

9th place

|}

7th place

|}

5th place

|}

3rd place

|}

Final

|}

Final standing

References

External links
European Universities Games 2016 – Volleyball

European Universities Games